The W. H. Boller Meat Market and Residence is located in Lomira, Wisconsin.

Description
The site is a 2-story cream brick building, originally containing a meat market, cold store, and living quarters, built in 1913 for William Boller. It was added to the State Register of Historic Places in 1992 and to the National Register of Historic Places in 1994.

References

Commercial buildings on the National Register of Historic Places in Wisconsin
Industrial buildings and structures on the National Register of Historic Places in Wisconsin
Residential buildings on the National Register of Historic Places in Wisconsin
National Register of Historic Places in Dodge County, Wisconsin
Food markets in the United States
Vernacular architecture in Wisconsin
Brick buildings and structures
Commercial buildings completed in 1913
Industrial buildings completed in 1913
Residential buildings completed in 1913
1913 establishments in Wisconsin